Ekaterina Dynnik (born 16 June 1999) is a Russian boxer.

She won a medal at the 2019 AIBA Women's World Boxing Championships.

References

1999 births
Living people
Russian women boxers
People from Mezhdurechensk, Kemerovo Oblast
AIBA Women's World Boxing Championships medalists
Light-welterweight boxers
Sportspeople from Kemerovo Oblast